Palmer Station is a United States research station in Antarctica located on Anvers Island, the only US station located north of the Antarctic Circle. Initial construction of the station finished in 1968. The station, like the other U.S. Antarctic stations, is operated by the United States Antarctic Program (USAP) of the National Science Foundation. The base is about as distant from the equator as Fairbanks, Alaska.

Description 
The station is named for Nathaniel B. Palmer, usually recognized as the first American to see Antarctica. The maximum population that Palmer Station can accommodate is 46 people. The normal austral summer contingent varies, but it is generally around 44 people. Palmer is staffed year-round; however, the population drops to around 13 people for winter maintenance after the conclusion of the summer research season. There are science labs located in the Bio-Lab building (pictured), the other main building is GWR (Garage, Warehouse, and Recreation). Webcam images of the station and a penguin colony on nearby Torgersen Island are available at the station's web site.

The facility is the second Palmer Station; "Old Palmer" was about a mile to the northwest adjacent to the site of the British Antarctic Survey "Base N", built in the mid-fifties. The site is on what is now known as Amsler Island. Old Palmer was built about 1965, and served as a base for those building "new" Palmer, which opened in 1968. Old Palmer was designated as an emergency refuge for the new station in case of disaster, though this perceived need disappeared over time. It was dismantled and removed from the Antarctic as part of the National Science Foundation's environmental cleanup efforts in the early 1990s.

Most of the station's personnel are seasonal employees of the U.S. Antarctic Program's main support contractor, Leidos. The summer support staff is usually 24 people. Previous main support contractors were Raytheon Polar Services, Holmes and Narver of Orange, California, ITT Antarctic Services of Paramus, New Jersey, and Antarctic Support Associates of Englewood, Colorado. Over time many support staff have worked for two or more of these firms.

Science 
Palmer Station is located at 64.77°S, 64.05°W. The majority of the science research conducted at Palmer Station revolves around marine biology. The station also houses year-round monitoring equipment for global seismic, atmospheric, and UV-monitoring networks, as well as a site for the study of heliophysics. Palmer also hosts a radio receiver that studies lightning over the Western Hemisphere.

Other research is conducted from the research vessels (R/V) Laurence M. Gould and Nathaniel B. Palmer. Science cruises cover physical oceanography, marine geology, and marine biology. The ship also carries field parties to sites around the Antarctic Peninsula to study glaciology, geology, and paleontology.

The USAP has a science planning summary for each year at Palmer Station.

In 2005, a research team from the Woods Hole Oceanographic Institution and the University of Southern Mississippi mapped the nearby ocean floor.

Climate 
The Köppen Climate Classification for Palmer Station is a tundra climate (ET). Due to its northern location within Antarctica and proximity to the coast, the temperatures moderate more than interior climates. Winters are generally cold and subzero, while summers are chilly, but regularly rise to temperatures above freezing. The average temperature for the year in Palmer Station is 28.8 °F (-1.8 °C). The warmest month, on average, is January. The coldest month is August.

Supply and transport 

Palmer Station is re-supplied by the R/V Laurence M. Gould, a ship with an ice-strengthened hull that makes routine science research cruises around the peninsula. The R/V Nathaniel B. Palmer, the United States Antarctic Program's other research vessel, has also made port calls to Palmer Station — Hero Inlet, where the pier is located, was previously too shallow for the Palmer to dock at the station, though after a pier improvement/replacement finished in 2022 docking is now done routinely. Both ships are staffed and leased to the USAP by Edison-Chouest Offshore.

Hero Inlet is named for the R/V Hero, a 125-foot wooden trawler-type vessel built to conduct research and supply Palmer Station from ports in Argentina and Chile. The Hero was owned by the National Science Foundation and built in 1968 by the Harvey Gamage shipyard in Maine. Palmer Station is located on Gamage Point, named for the shipbuilder. Other people believe that Hero Inlet is named after Capt. Nathaniel Palmer's 47 foot sloop, Hero, that he was sailing when he first sighted Antarctica.

After years of service, the Hero was retired in 1984 and replaced by the R/V Polar Duke, a larger and more modern ice-strengthened vessel under charter from Rieber Shipping, based in Bergen, Norway. The Duke was replaced by the R/V Laurence M. Gould in 1997.

There is no routine air access to Palmer. Over the years, small ski-equipped aircraft have occasionally landed on the glacier to the east of the station.

USAP participants travel aboard the Laurence M. Gould from Punta Arenas, Chile. The course follows the Straits of Magellan to the east, then south along the coast of Argentina, past Cape Horn, then directly south across the Drake Passage and on to Anvers Island. The entire journey usually takes four days; however, sea ice and storms can slow the journey down.

In popular culture 
The 1980 Japanese film Fukkatsu no hi (Day of Resurrection/Virus) revolves around Palmer Station as the gathering place for humanity's last survivors of a deadly virus. The film stars George Kennedy as Admiral Conway, the station's commanding officer and features Glenn Ford as the President of the United States. Much of the footage for the film was shot in the vicinity of Palmer Station, though none was actually filmed at the station. Although the actual station can accommodate fewer than 50 people, the station depicted in the film housed several hundred.

Gallery

See also

 List of Antarctic research stations
 List of Antarctic field camps
 List of airports in Antarctica
McMurdo Station
South Pole Station
Byrd Station
Operation Deep Freeze
Siple Station
Ellsworth Station
Brockton Station
Eights Station
Plateau Station
Hallett Station
Little America V

References

External links 

 Archived Palmer Station page on Global Fiducials Program site
 Research blog of a 2008 expedition at Palmer Station
 Archived Palmer Station page on Antarctic Connection
 Palmer Long-Term Ecological Research
 NSF (National Science Foundation) Ultraviolet (UV) Monitoring Network with picture
USAP Palmer Station webcam
Palmer Station on LocalWiki

Outposts of Graham Land
Geography of Anvers Island
Anvers Island
United States Antarctic Program
Argentine Antarctica
British Antarctic Territory
Chilean Antarctic Territory
1968 establishments in Antarctica